Leionema gracile, commonly known as Mt Greville phebalium, is a  shrub species that is endemic to  Queensland, Australia. It is a small shrub with spreading leaves, white petals and  flowers from autumn to spring.

Description
The calyx lobes are triangular shaped and smooth. Flowering occurs from autumn to spring.

Taxonomy and naming
Mt Greville phebalium was first formally described as Phebalium gracile, but the name was changed to Leionema gracile in 1998 by Paul G. Wilson and the description was published in the journal Nuytsia. The specific epithet (gracile) is from the Latin gracilis meaning thin or slender.

Distribution and habitat
This species has a restricted distribution found growing at higher altitudes on  Mount Moon and Mount Greville in south-eastern Queensland on rocky outcrops.

References

gracile
Sapindales of Australia
Flora of Queensland
Taxa named by Paul G. Wilson